SMB Adventure is an inshore Survey Motor Boat of the Royal New Zealand Navy and part of the Navy's Deployable Hydrographic Unit. Adventure is capable of independent operations and short coastal passages.

SMB Adventure was built in Kumeu, North Auckland, in 1998. A catamaran hull was chosen to give a wide working area aft and allow the multibeam echo sounder to be retracted between the hulls.

Adventure is fitted with an echo sounder and data can be integrated with the multi-beam system fitted to Resolution.

References

Survey ships of the Royal New Zealand Navy
1998 ships
Individual catamarans